Lillian Langdon (November 25, 1860 – February 8, 1943) was an American film actress of the silent era. She appeared in more than 80 films between 1912 and 1928. 

Born in Newark, New Jersey, Langdon was a descendant of Montgomery Pike, discoverer of Pike's Peak, and Jasper Crane, founder of Newark. She acted on stage before she began her career in films. In private life, she was known as Lillie H. Bolles.

She died at her home in Santa Monica, California, aged 82.

Selected filmography

 Kindling (1915) – Mrs. Jane Burke-Smith
 The Wharf Rat (1916)
 Intolerance (1916) - Mary, mother of Jesus
 Diane of the Follies (1916) – Marcia Christy
 The Americano (1917) – Senora de Castille
 Jim Bludso (1917)
 Might and the Man (1917)
 Indiscreet Corinne (1917)
 Because of a Woman (1917)
 I Love You (1918)
 Limousine Life (1918)
 Society for Sale (1918) – Lady Mary
 The Last Rebel (1918)
 Everywoman's Husband (1918) – Mrs. Rhodes
 False Ambition (1918) – Mrs. Van Dixon
 Shifting Sands (1918) – Mrs. Stanford
 Daddy-Long-Legs (1919)
 Prudence on Broadway (1919)
 When a Man Loves (1919)
 The Millionaire Pirate (1919)
 His Majesty, the American (1919) – Princess Marguerite
 A Regular Fellow (1919) – Mrs. Christy
 The Triflers (1920)
 Going Some (1920)
 The Great Accident (1920)
 The Hope (1920)
 Oh, Lady, Lady (1920) – Mrs. Farringdon
 The Triflers (1920)
 The Mother Heart (1921) – Mrs. Lincoln
 The Swamp (1921) – Mrs. Biddie
 What's a Wife Worth? (1921) – Mrs. Penfield
 Kissed (1922)
 The Strangers' Banquet (1922)
 Lights of the Desert (1922)
 Fools of Fortune (1922)
 The Glorious Fool (1922)
 Nobody's Bride (1923)
 Going Up (1923)
 The Prisoner (1923) – Mrs. Garrison
 The Wanters (1923) – Mrs. Worthington
 White Tiger (1923)
 Cobra (1925)
 The Thoroughbred (1925)
 After Business Hours (1925)
 The Wall Street Whiz (1925)
 Joanna (1925) – Mrs. Roxanna Adams
 The Blonde Saint (1926)
 The Millionaire Policeman (1926)
 Fifth Avenue (1926)
 The Cheer Leader (1928)

References

External links

1860 births
1943 deaths
American film actresses
American silent film actresses
Actresses from New Jersey
20th-century American actresses